August Floyd Coppola (February 16, 1934 – October 27, 2009) was an American academic, author, film executive, and advocate for the arts. He was the brother of director Francis Ford Coppola and actress Talia Shire, and the father of actor Nicolas Cage, radio DJ Marc Coppola and director Christopher Coppola.

Early life and family
August Coppola was the son of composer and flautist Carmine Coppola (1910–1991) and Italia Pennino Coppola (1912–2004), a lyricist and matriarch of the Coppola family. His siblings were film director Francis Ford Coppola and actress Talia Shire; his uncle was composer Anton Coppola.

Education and work
Coppola received his undergraduate degree at UCLA and his graduate degree at Hofstra University, where his thesis Ernest Hemingway: The Problem of In Our Time was published in 1956. Coppola earned his doctorate at Occidental College in 1960.

He taught comparative literature at Cal State Long Beach in the 1960s and '70s and served as a trustee of the California State University system before moving to San Francisco in 1984. He then served as Dean of Creative Arts at San Francisco State University. In this role, Coppola earned a reputation of being a champion of the arts on the campus and in the community, and for promoting diversity within the student body of the arts school.

Coppola also worked in film, like many other members of his family. He was an executive at his brother's American Zoetrope film studio, where he was involved in the revival of Abel Gance's 1927 silent film Napoléon.  He was the founder and president of the San Francisco Film and Video Arts Commission, and served on the jury of the 36th Berlin International Film Festival in 1986. Also, Coppola served as chairman and CEO of Education First!, an organization seeking Hollywood studio support for educational programs.

Coppola also worked as an advocate for art appreciation among the visually impaired. He is credited as being the creator of the Tactile Dome, a feature at the San Francisco Exploratorium museum. The Dome is a lightless maze that requires visitors to pass through using only their sense of touch. In 1972 Coppola opened the AudioVision Workshop with colleague Gregory Frazier, which employed Frazier's process of audio recording descriptions of film and theater action for the benefit of visually impaired audiences.

Coppola was the author of the romantic novel The Intimacy (1978).

Personal life 
Coppola married German-American dancer Joy Vogelsang (1935–2021) in 1960; they had three sons: Marc, Christopher, and Nicolas. Among his nieces and nephews are director Sofia Coppola and actor Jason Schwartzman.

Coppola and Vogelsang divorced in 1976. He married Marie Thenevin on April 16, 1981. That marriage ended in 1986. His last marriage was to Martine Chevallier, an actress with the Comédie-Française in Paris.

Coppola's final home was in Los Angeles, where he died of a heart attack on October 27, 2009, at age 75.

Legacy
The 150-seat August Coppola Theater on the San Francisco State University campus is named in his honor. Francis Ford Coppola dedicated his 1983 film Rumble Fish to him.

Nicolas Cage partially based his idea for the film The Sorcerer's Apprentice (2010) and his character Balthazar on his father August Coppola. The closing credits read "With Memories of Dr. August Coppola".

See also
Coppola family tree

References

External links

1934 births
2009 deaths
California State University, Long Beach faculty
American male writers
American writers of Italian descent
People of Campanian descent
People of Lucanian descent
August
Hofstra University alumni
Occidental College alumni
People from Greater Los Angeles
San Francisco State University faculty
University of California, Los Angeles alumni
Writers from Hartford, Connecticut